is a Japanese figure skater. She represented Japan at the 2012 World Junior Championships in Minsk, Belarus. She qualified to the free skate by placing 13th in the short program and went on to finish 12th overall.

Programs

Competitive highlights

References

External links 
 

1996 births
Japanese female single skaters
Living people
Figure skaters from Nagoya